Hazy Islands Wilderness, at 32 acres (16 ha), is Alaska's smallest wilderness area. It was officially designated as Wilderness in 1970 by the United States Congress.  The islands are located west of Coronation Island in the Alaska Panhandle area. Hazy Islands Wilderness comprises five small islands and is home to 10 species of birds, including Brandt's cormorant (Phalacrocorax auritus). It has no anchorages or campsites, and human visitation is discouraged to protect the birds.

Name
The name for the islands in the Tlingit language is Deikee Noow, which can be translated as Outer (Deikee) Fort (Noow), although the word "noow" is also the name for a treeless rock formation.  It figures into the "Raven Cycle' story of when Yéil (Raven) stole freshwater from Gánóok (Petrel).

Description
Hazy Islands National Wildlife Refuge was established in 1912, which became designated as Wilderness in 1970, and incorporated into the Alaska Maritime National Wildlife Refuge, Gulf of Alaska Unit, in 1980.

Big Hazy Island and the four smaller islands provide predator-free nesting areas for large populations of: 

common murres 
pigeon guillemots 
glaucous-winged gulls 
horned puffins 
tufted puffins 
Brandt's cormorants

References

See also
 List of U.S. Wilderness Areas
 Wilderness Act

Alaska Maritime National Wildlife Refuge
Protected areas of Prince of Wales–Hyder Census Area, Alaska
Wilderness areas of Alaska
Protected areas established in 1970
1970 establishments in Alaska